Benevolent assimilation refers to a policy of the United States towards the Philippines as described in a proclamation by US President William McKinley that was issued in a memorandum to the U.S. Secretary of War on December 21, 1898, after the signing of the Treaty of Paris, which ended the Spanish–American War. It stated that future control, disposition, and government of the Philippine islands had been ceded to the United States and that the US military government was to be extended over the whole of the ceded territory.

About six months earlier, on June 12, 1898, Emilio Aguinaldo had declared the Philippines to be a free and independent nation and had established a revolutionary government. The Filipino revolutionary armed forces were then deployed and had remained in positions surrounding US Army forces occupying Manila. This juxtaposition eventually developed into a standoff between opposing forces that would erupt in fighting in early 1899 to ignite the Philippine–American War.

The proclamation read in part:

The proclamation was sent to General Elwell Otis, US military commander and Governor-General in the Philippines. Otis sent Emilio Aguinaldo a version of the proclamation that he had bowdlerized by removing mention of US sovereignty "to stress our benevolent purpose" and not "offend Filipino sensibilities" by substituting "free people" for "supremacy of the United States" and deleting "to exercise future domination." General Otis had also sent an unaltered copy of the proclamation to General Marcus Miller in Iloilo City, who, unaware that an altered version had been sent to Aguinaldo, passed a copy to a Filipino official there. The unaltered version eventually made its way to Aguinaldo.

Otis later explained:

See also
Schurman Commission
Colonialism
Racism

References

External links
 University of Hawaii Philippine History Site article on Benevolent Assimilation

History of the Philippines (1898–1946)
1898 in the United States